Survivors is a novel series written by a team of authors under the pseudonym Erin Hunter. Survivors follows the adventures of a group of former domestic dogs who form a Pack with the help of Lucky, a Lone Dog, after an earthquake separates them from their owners. The first book, The Empty City, was released on 21 August 2012, and was followed by eleven more books written between 2013 and 2019. 

There are two sub-series, each containing six books. The first, Survivors: The Original Series, was published from 2012 to 2015. The second, Survivors: The Gathering Darkness, was written from 2015 to 2019. 

Three e-book novellas entitled Alpha's Tale, Sweet's Journey and Moon's Choice have also been released. The Survivors series has been released in e-book format for popular e-readers such as the Barnes & Noble Nook and Amazon Kindle. The series has also been translated into several languages. Survivors has garnered positive reviews, with critics praising the pacing, characters, and "magical" style of writing.

Inspiration and origins
HarperCollins, publisher of the Survivors series, first suggested that the Erin Hunter team write a book series about dogs, but Victoria Holmes, a member of the team, was reluctant to create stories that would be too close to Warriors, the biggest series published under the Erin Hunter name. It was instead decided that the new series would be about bears, which became the Seekers series. In an interview two years later, Holmes said that, though she was "happy to focus on cats and bears right now", she would consider doing a series about dogs in the future. Gillian Philip, a former member of the Hunter team, later said that "dogs just felt like a natural progression from cats".

After the conclusion of Seekers, the team invited Inbali Iselris, author of The Tygrine Cat, to write a new series about dogs. After joining the Erin Hunter team, she spent more time with her dog, Michi, watching his behavior closely. Some of his mannerisms gave her material to develop the characters of Lucky and his companions.

While other series published under the name Erin Hunter had their preliminary plots written by a single author, a different approach was taken for the Survivors series. The whole team created a detailed story outline and developed the characters together. Then, the writing itself is done by a single author.

Books

The Original Series

The Empty City
On a Long Light (summer) day, the "Big Growl" (an earthquake), strikes, killing all the Longpaws (humans) in the area. Lucky the male sheltie-retriever mix and his friend Sweet, a female greyhound, escape from a Trap House (dog pound). The two go their separate ways - Sweet wants to be part of a Pack while Lucky wishes to be a Lone Dog. When Lucky is trapped by red foxes, he is saved by his long-lost sister Squeak, now called Bella, who leads a group of six other former Leashed Dogs (dogs kept as pets by Longpaws) who are sure that their owners will come back for them – these include Bruno, a male German shepherd-chow chow mix Fight Dog, Martha, a Newfoundland dog, Alfie, a bulldog, Sunshine, a Maltese dog, Daisy, the West Highland white terrier-Jack Russell terrier mix, and Mickey the Farm Dog (border collie). Lucky decides to join them temporarily and show them how to survive in this new world before going back to being a loner. He recounts some of his life to Bella, where he was once owned by an abusive Longpaw man that he escaped from. It is eventually decided that the Leashed Dogs cannot continue to wait for their lost Longpaw owners to return, so they join Lucky as they move off into the nearby wilderness, beyond the city. After Martha saves Bruno from drowning in a river, Lucky teaches the Pack how to divide work based on their abilities. When Alfie finds an abandoned dog-training facility with food, Bella and Daisy follow him. Lucky refuses to enter and later finds that the others have been captured in the facility (termed the Dog-Garden) by a Pack of 16 Fierce Dogs (Doberman Pinschers) already living there. Lucky helps the hostages escape and leads them to safety. He makes them bury any trace of their owners. Lucky leaves the Pack but is driven to return when he hears fighting.

A Hidden Enemy
Lucky and the Leashed Pack are attacked by some members of another dog Pack, a Wild Pack of 13, and realize that their Alpha is a male wolfdog, who kills Alfie. An aftershock of the Big Growl occurs, causing the Packs to scatter. Lucky rescues the Wild Pack's female Beta Swift Dog (racing dog), revealed to be Sweet. Lucky hides that he is affiliated with The Leashed Pack. Sweet invites Lucky to her Pack, so Lucky acts as a spy for the Leashed Pack. He is temporarily made a patrol dog in the Wild Pack, briefly working with Twitch, the male spaniel-beagle mix chase-dog, and Dart, the female whippet mix. During a prey-sharing feast, Mulch, the male English cocker spaniel mix, tries to steal a dead mouse from the prey pile when it is not his turn, but Sweet snaps at him and threatens to demote him from his hunting and patrol duties. Lucky later feels a sense of loyalty to the Pack during a nightly howling ritual of theirs called the Great Howl. At one point, he sees a mysterious crow and believes it may be a messenger of the Forest-Dog (forest spirits). Days later, Lucky becomes an official hunter within the Wild Pack after winning a challenge against Snap, the female beagle-terrier mix, and begins working alongside her, as well as with Fiery, the male English mastiff, and Spring. Mulch is, at the same time, demoted to a patrol dog. Weeks later, the small, male pug mix Omega named Whine, who sees Lucky secretly meeting Bella's Pack later that night, blackmails him and makes him frame Mulch for eating pieces of a freshly-caught mule deer doe before a feast. Mulch is then physically harmed by the Alpha and is demoted to Omega, while Whine is promoted to a patrol dog. Bella and the rest of the Leashed Pack (without warning Lucky) soon attack the Wild Pack with red foxes. The foxes kill Mulch and Fuzz. The two Packs then come together to drive the foxes out. Sweet advises Alpha to merge the two Packs and Alpha agrees, but Whine reveals Lucky's secret of being a spy for Bella's Pack, forcing him to choose which side he is on.

Darkness Falls
Alpha allows Lucky and the Leashed Dogs to stay and merge the two Packs into one Pack of 18, but Lucky is demoted to Omega, and about to be scarred as punishment, but Alpha is suddenly frightened after the appearance of a loud sound and black cloud in the distance (volcanic activity) that seems too unusual to be a storm. Lucky temporarily takes charge, and helps the Pack as they evacuate the camp for higher ground. After finding temporary shelter, Twitch decides to leave the Pack after breaking one of his forelegs during the retreat and Mickey later leaves, interpreting the strange cloud as a sign that the Longpaws who used to own him and the other Leashed Dogs of the Pack are back. Alpha banishes Lucky, thinking he angered the Sky-Dogs. After escaping some volcanic ash, Lucky eventually finds Mickey defending his Longpaws' abandoned home against other Longpaws, but the house collapses. Lucky convinces Mickey that his Longpaws are never coming back, much to Mickey's sorrowful disappointment. Soon, after returning to the forest and seeing Longpaws riding in Loudbirds (helicopters) in the distance, Lucky and Mickey find three abandoned nameless Fierce Dog pups back at the Dog-Garden whose mother is dead. Seeing that the Pack of adults has left the compound to find more food, they take the pups with them and give them Pup-Names: Grunt, Lick and Wiggle. They narrowly avoid a Pack of coyotes and search for their own Pack's whereabouts. They find Daisy, and take the pups back to their own Pack's new camp, in a tranquil glade, where Alpha reluctantly allows them to stay, but leaves Lucky in charge of them as an Omega. Lucky and a few other members of the Pack train the Fierce Dog pups how to duel, but do their best to teach them not to play fight too roughly. Alpha puts the three pups to the test to see if they can truly never be ferocious and asks them to follow Daisy's orders during a scouting mission. However, during this scouting mission, a male Giantfur (brown bear) emerges from nowhere and threatens the dogs. Lucky and Alpha rescue the pups. Lucky has a serious discussion with Bella about her reckless and regretful choice in hiring the foxes to attack the Pack. Later, a Pack that claims to be the Fierce Dogs' original Pack, traps the Wild Pack and takes the pups away. Their leader, Blade, claims that she is their mother, even though it is heavily implied that she is the one who murdered the pups' real mother. Lucky is saddened by the departure of the three pups, believing that they could have grown up to be gentle Fierce Dogs with an unquestionable loyalty to the Wild Pack. Later, as Red Leaf (autumn) approaches, to prove his own loyalty to the Wild Pack and show he does not want to go back to being a Lone Dog, Lucky challenges Snap to a second duel for hunter status, but loses. Sweet takes this as evidence that Lucky is indeed now a Pack Dog and is happy that he will not leave. The next morning, Lick returns to the Wild Pack, covered with scratches, and tells them that Blade murdered Wiggle and Grunt. The Wild Pack then decides to depart the unsafe area for new territory beyond a white rocky ridge.

The Broken Path
Lucky and Fiery teach Lick how to hunt. While hunting, they tell Lick about how a Naming Ceremony works. When returning to the new camp with their catches, Lucky stops to talk to Bella, and the two get into a brief feud over betraying each other's trust, though they end up forgiving each other. They then battle a badger during a brief and sudden storm. Once they return to the camp, Lucky catches the scent of an unknown pup and who it could have been. 

Later that night, it is time for Nose and Squirm's Naming Ceremony, where they get official Adult-Names, Thorn and Beetle. After the ceremony is over and everyone is howling ritualistically, Lucky thinks he hears the distant howls of dogs not from the Wild Pack. Lucky discovers that Grunt, now called Fang, is spying on them. This means the Wild Pack must move on. As the Pack trudges through different regions, they encounter volcanic acid rain, and Alpha is uncertain in deciding which direction to go.

Eventually, they discover a small abandoned Longpaw town. They spend the night in a Food House (restaurant). The next day, while Lucky, Mickey, Bruno, Snap and Fiery go hunting in the forest, they encounter an unorganized and violent Wild Pack of nine dogs that Twitch has joined out of sheer desperation. This absurd Pack is led by a male pit bull-mastiff mix named Terror. He says he is the Forepaw for a wicked spirit-dog called the Fear-Dog, who he claims rules all the other spirit-dogs. Terror orders his Pack to drive the hunting party out of the forest.

After escaping and telling the rest of the Pack of what happened, Alpha decides the best way to deal with Terror's Pack is to fight him one-on-one. However, Fiery challenges Alpha's leadership and insists they fight for the title of Alpha. Should Fiery win, he would be the new Alpha of their Pack and the current Alpha would have to go back to using his old name. Later, on a hunting expedition, they encounter more Longpaws that begin to chase the dogs, trying to catch them. Fiery, during this chase, is suddenly caught in a net trap and tells the other dogs to leave and find help. Everyone in the Pack agrees that something needs to be done, but Alpha refuses, saying that they should move on to a safer territory and forget Fiery. However, Twitch suddenly appears, and tells his former Pack that he's abandoned Terror's Pack and has seen where the Longpaws are taking Fiery: to the Dog-Garden Twitch and Lucky bring Moon, Martha and Bella on a rescue mission while Alpha leads the rest of their Wild Pack away from the town and Terror's forest.

At the Dog-Garden, they discover Fiery is locked in a cage next to cages containing other kinds of innocent animals, all being experimented on by the strange Longpaws through being forced to drink possibly dirty water, to make sure it is okay for Longpaws to drink. The team frees all the animals, including Fiery, and they leave. A brief conversation with Axe, a dog they helped escape, reveals that Lick is one of the pups that came from a dog called Morningstar. The Pack Dogs leave, and Axe chooses to stay behind and fight the Longpaws. Eventually, the rescue party and Fiery (now very injured and sick from the bad water) encounter Terror's Pack again, and fight. During the battle, Lick kills Terror, ripping off his lower jaw. This sends his remaining Pack retreating. Fiery is fatally injured, and dies. The others bury both him and Terror. Lucky then realizes that Lick is worthy enough to get her Adult-Name. Lick chooses to rename herself Storm. The dogs then continue westward, following a strange salty smell.

The Endless Lake
Ice Wind (winter) is starting, and Lucky, Bella, Martha, Moon, Twitch and Storm are resting on their journey back to the rest of their Wild Pack, tracking them to their new territory, though Twitch plans to become a Lone Dog. Along the way, they find that they are being stalked. It is revealed that they are being followed by seven former members of Terror's Pack. With Terror dead, they don't want to harm other dogs anymore. Terror's Pack convinces Twitch to come with them.

After arriving at a more open space, the five dogs discover where a mysterious salty scent has been coming from: a huge body of water which they call the Endless Lake. Eventually, while traveling north along the beach, they arrive on the outskirts of an abandoned coastal dock. After eating their fill of dead fish, they begin to head through the nearby town when they suddenly catch the scent of Blade's Pack, who have apparently been marking their new territory here. They then run into Fang and two other Fierce Dogs. Fang tries to persuade Storm to rejoin their original Pack, which she refuses. When a chase ensues, Fang reveals that he actually misses Storm and encourages his sister and her four Packmates to hide from Blade. Fang misleads the other members of Blade's Pack by saying that he lost Lucky's gang and that they should look elsewhere for them. Lucky and the others hide until Blade's Pack has gone far away, and then they escape.

By late sunset, the five traveling dogs take shelter in a cave for the night. The next day, they find that the rest of their Pack is in a small sloping valley. After the Wild Pack has a reunion, Lucky, Bella, Martha, Moon, and Storm tell everyone the sad news about Fiery's death and the interesting news about how Twitch has now become the new Alpha of Terror's former Pack.  Lucky also tells of their encounter with Blade's Pack and their new camp location in the nearby abandoned Longpaw town. The others are fearful of that, but Lucky points out that this is also good news because they now know where the cruel Fierce Dogs are at the moment. Lucky also informs them of Storm recently choosing her Adult-Name. Most of the Pack congratulates her for this, but Alpha becomes infuriated because it was a Naming Ceremony without his authorization and he insists on still calling Storm "Lick". When prey becomes scarce due to it being early Ice Wind, Alpha decides that everyone in the Wild Pack should go hunt for prey together. After failing this all-Pack hunt on the beach, Mickey, Lucky and Snap are sent out to hunt.

After they eat, Storm's "authorized" Naming Ceremony happens that night, though Alpha says she is no longer able to use Storm as her Adult-Name. Storm insists that she likes the name she already chose, but Alpha instead forcefully names her "Savage" and declares that everyone should call her that and not Storm or else he will severely punish them. At one point, while seeking out yet another new territory, the Wild Pack comes to an abandoned lighthouse, and Blade's Pack finds them there and a battle ensues. Alpha, Spring, Beetle, and Thorn fall into the seawater due to windy and foggy conditions during the fight. Blade's Pack retreats and Martha dives into the water and rescues both Beetle and Thorn, though Spring is pulled out to sea and Alpha sinks down below the waves. The rest of the remaining Pack spends the night inside the lighthouse. The next day, the dogs move on for a safer place and Lucky decides that, instead of choosing a new Alpha, they should use a more democratic way to confront Blade and possibly redeem Fang. Lucky finds that Storm's former Pack has now taken her hostage.

Sweet is declared the new Alpha and she appoints Lucky as her Beta. They all head back to the town to rescue Storm, who is being forced by Blade and her followers to fight with Fang in what is called the Trial of Rage, a rite of passage in Blade's Pack: when a Fierce Dog pup reaches adulthood, they must pass the test to unleash their inner blood-lust. Sweet establishes a plan for most of the Wild Pack to distract the Fierce Dogs while Martha escorts Storm out of the theater. Storm, though, still bonded with Fang, doesn't want to abandon him. It is then revealed that the Wild Pack's former Alpha actually survived drowning and has now joined Blade's Pack.

A few days later, after the Wild Pack has left the Longpaw town, Sweet and Lucky spread the news about Lucky's recent strange dreams that tell of the Storm of Dogs, in which the rest of the Pack say they have heard of this event foretold before. Lucky says that if the Storm of Dogs is coming, no dog will have to stand alone, and that they will all be in it together.

Storm of Dogs
Lucky and Sweet have officially become mates, and life in the Wild Pack has become generally well-regulated ever since they became in charge. It has been a full month since the Trial of Rage and the recent fight with Blade's Pack, and so far the Wild Pack is getting along well. Storm is a hunter, Mickey and Snap are mates, and Thorn and Beetle are patrol dogs. During a fight-training session, Moon and Dart report that Blade's Pack has left the coastal town without a trace and that now the scent of Longpaws is there. Sweet leads a patrol down to the town to investigate and find only Longpaw construction workers trying to fix the damaged town. They report back, and the Pack decides to stay put. Although most of the Pack is a little worried, Sweet tells them to continue to patrol the territory for Blade's Pack and to avoid the Longpaws until they have determined whether they are truly friendly or not. 

That night, after the spirit of Alfie warns Lucky in a dream about the Storm of Dogs, Sweet wakes Lucky and takes him to a private area away from the rest of the Pack for a special and confidential ceremony about his status as Beta. After Lucky pledges to be loyal to the Pack, the two dogs return to the camp to finish the rest of the ceremony with the rest of the Pack. Later that night, Lucky wakes up again to be faced with Fang, covered in injuries. Fang claims that he left Blade's Pack because he lost the Trial of Rage and was considered a weakling to Blade, so he came to find Lucky to warn the Wild Pack that Blade's Pack plans to attack them again. Lucky takes pity on Fang and walks with him to a large cave by the beach, only to be ambushed by Blade and her followers. Lucky is captured, brought into the cave and thrown into a pit, temporarily knocking him out cold. When he awakens, Lucky finds Blade staring down at him and she tells him more about why she's obsessed with trying to kill Storm. She tells that she has had strange visions in her sleep involving the Storm of Dogs, similar to Lucky, and believes that the Spirit Dogs are telling her to specifically kill any Fierce Dog pups born after the Big Growl so they do not truly bring on the Storm of Dogs.

Blade leaves, and Lucky's former Alpha shows up, and explains that even though he hates Fierce Dogs, he still admires Blade's ferocious authority and that's why he has joined her Pack. Soon, Sweet, Bella, and Storm show up and save Lucky, only to be cornered by Blade's Pack. Lucky and Storm try to convince Fang to rejoin Sweet's Pack, but Blade immediately kills him. Suddenly, the tremor sign of a new big earthquake, similar to the Big Growl, occurs, frightening everyone and sending Lucky, Storm, Bella, and Sweet running out of the cave.

A few days later, it is announced to the whole of Sweet's Pack that they should probably leave the small valley, because of both Blade's Pack and the apparent omens of a new Big Growl. Lucky, Snap and most of the former Leashed Dogs go on a brief mission to warn the construction worker Longpaws in the nearby abandoned coastal town about the new Growl. Although the Longpaws don't understand what the dogs are telling them, they suddenly see the Endless Lake moving in with a tsunami and run away. Lucky leads the other dogs back up the cliff to the rest of the Pack. After the Wild Pack settles down and the second Big Growl ends, Lucky tells everyone about the dreams he has seen about the Storm of Dogs. Although some of the Pack suggest they should flee, Whine says that they should hand Storm over to Blade to save themselves. Although Sweet and Lucky refuse to do so, they allow the Pack to vote on whether or not they should give Storm to Blade. However, only Whine, Dart, and Bruno vote that they should give Storm to Blade while the rest refuse. Bella has an idea: Sweet's Pack will set Blade up to fight and isolate her from the rest of the Cruel Pack, and take the Pack by surprise. Thinking that their plan will fail, Whine leaves the Pack.

Soon, Sweet's Pack decide to go seek out help from Twitch's Pack in order to increase their numbers against Blade's Pack. At one point in the search, the Pack splits up in order to find Twitch's Pack. During their search, Lucky, Snap, Storm, and Daisy hear a cry for help and see a member of Twitch's Pack, Whisper, whose tail is trapped by a fallen tree and is near a female Giantfur's den. After Whisper is freed, they tell him that they must speak with Twitch, so he takes them back to his own Pack to do so. The two Packs come together for their meeting. Twitch wonders if they really should risk their lives in joining this upcoming battle, though all of his seven Packmates insist they should.

The two Packs plan an ambush near the river and Lucky decides to use himself as bait to lure Blade and her deputies out of hiding. He travels back to Blade's Pack's cave to tell them that Storm accepts Blade's challenge. Lucky returns to the Wild Pack, but suddenly a young male Fierce Dog from Blade's Pack named Arrow shows up and tells everyone that he has abandoned Blade's Pack because of Blade's madness. He says that the prophecy is all she talks about, and that he wishes to join the Wild Pack. He also reveals that Blade already knows some of their plans because Whine has recently joined her Pack and revealed some information to her.

To throw Blade off guard, Lucky, Sweet and Whisper rouse a Giantfur to fight Blade's Pack in order to weaken their ranks. The Wild Pack gets ready for the fight near a frozen river, and just in time since Blade and her Pack has arrived, weakened and reduced in number. A blizzard comes forth and the great battle of the Storm of Dogs now ensues; a few Fierce Dogs from Blade's Pack fall. Lucky kills his former Alpha. It all comes down to Storm versus Blade, who fight on top of cracking ice, which Blade eventually falls through and drowns. The remaining members of Blade's Pack, now led by Dagger, retreat, and banish Whine for being practically useless - the little traitorous dog is also not welcome in either of the two Wild Packs. Sweet's Pack, accompanied by Twitch's Pack, return to their small coastal valley home. Sweet agrees to allow Twitch's Pack to join her Pack. Later that night, during the Great Howl ceremony, Lucky sees the Spirit-Dogs and the souls of the deceased visiting his Pack, before returning to the Forest Beyond (afterlife).

The Gathering Darkness

A Pack Divided
Storm is leading a hunt on a day in Tree Flower (spring), also called New Leaf, for the first time after the long Ice Wind season. The hunting party dogs decide to try hunting by a hollow. Later that night, as the prey-sharing feast starts and after Storm play-fights with Beetle and Thorn, Thorn and Beetle are suddenly hostile, stating that Twitch had better not try to eat before their mother, Moon. Storm is surprised that her two friends would act like this, thinking that the prey caught was enough for everybody. Sweet does, however, let Twitch eat before Moon. Twitch is soon promoted to third-in-command, and Storm feels the tension in the Pack intensifying. After the prey-sharing, Storm asks to play-fight with Thorn and Beetle again, who decline. Sweet, who is now pregnant with her and Lucky's first litter, notices the tension reawakening and offers to tell a story of the Spirit-Dogs. Sweet tells the other dogs about the Wind-Dogs, a group of Spirit-Dogs that reside in the sky (similarly to the Sky-Dogs), and how they run all year trying to catch the elusive Golden Deer before Ice Wind. She says that if a mortal pack manages to catch one of the offspring of the great Golden Deer, then that Pack is truly blessed by the Spirit-Dogs. Still, tensions continue to rise, with some the dogs of Twitch's old Pack thinking Sweet and Lucky favor the original members of their own Pack more. 

The following night, Storm keeps waking up to find that she has sleepwalked a distance away from the camp. One day, Storm leads the hunting party and catches a whiff of deer everywhere and suggests that it might be a Golden Deer. They lose the deer scent. Sweet and Lucky attempt to resolve tensions by promoting Twitch to the Pack's third-in-command. At one point, Loudbirds show up, meaning that Longpaws are returning to the area. Later, when the hunters go investigate the abandoned coastal Longpaw town, they find the dead body of the female Fierce Dog named Ripper. Bruno reveals a dark secret of his: he is not very trustful of Fierce Dogs. 

Moon is mysteriously framed for stealing food before the food-sharing ceremony and she is thus temporarily sent on the duty of High Watch, overlooking the Endless Lake. Not long after that, Storm discovers that Arrow and Bella have secretly formed a romantic relationship with each other; she also finds a red fox kit murdered by an unknown dog, which the kit's family seeks the big Wild Pack of dogs for revenge, to avenge the kit, who was named Cub Fire. Storm discovers that Whisper is developing strong feelings for her during a hunt. A day later, Storm, Lucky and Snap come back from a hunt, and they discover that Whisper has been murdered.

Dead of Night
Lucky becomes paranoid about Whisper's death possibly having to do with the vengeance-seeking foxes, so he plots war upon them. As Storm investigates how Whisper's killer may have pulled it off, she imagines the scenario and is then frightened by how perfect it appears, as if she committed it herself - she reminds herself that she could not have done it in a mindless rage since she was out hunting a Golden Deer with Lucky and Snap when Whisper was killed. Whisper's funeral occurs. All of a sudden, Sweet starts to go into labor, so everyone has to cut the funeral short and head back to camp. Lucky and Sweet soon introduce their litter of four pups to the rest of the Pack; this litter consists of three daughters called Nibble, Tiny and Fluff, and one son called Tumble. Later, while out spying on the nearby red fox Pack, Storm, Thorn, Dart and Snap find that the foxes could not possibly be responsible for Whisper's death - being obviously weaker than the real killer and due to the fact that they left no scent at the site of the assassination, and the fact that the murderer's jaw marks on Whisper's body were larger than the jaws of a fox - and Storm realizes that it must be another dog who committed the crimes (Whisper's murder, Cub Fire's murder, and framing Moon for stealing food), most likely one among their own Pack. 

One evening, Storm asks Moon if she saw anything on the evening of Whisper's murder while on High Watch, and Moon tells her that she did see the silhouetted shapes of two dogs wandering into the shadows of the trees before Whisper was killed. After a number of pointless conflicts with the nearby fox Pack, a pregnant female fox, named Fox Mist, is caught and held prisoner. She is later set free, but with a warning that her Pack should not attack the dogs of Sweet's Pack ever again. 

Later, Storm feels better after some rest, and she, Lucky and other hunters happily go out looking for more Golden Deer, but instead find a herd of ordinary mule deer; they catch and kill two mule deer and drag the bodies back to camp. During the prey-sharing feast, after Sweet, Lucky, and their pups eat first, Twitch suddenly starts choking on shards of clear-stone (glass) that were mysteriously stuffed into one of the deer haunches.

Into the Shadows
After Snap successfully helps to get the clear-stone shards out of Twitch's mouth, saving his life, some of the other dogs begin to believe Arrow may have put the clear-stone into the prey. Later that night, Storm eavesdrops on Bruno, Snap, Dart, Woody and Ruff, who are conspiring to keep an eye on Arrow to see if he does anything suspicious. After she returns from an unsuccessful hunting trip, the conspirators immediately start calling Arrow a bad dog, even ignoring Lucky and Sweet's commands to stop. Arrow, however, finally stands up for himself and declares that it would be better if he just leave the whole Pack, and Bella says that if he leaves, she leaves too. They leave, and Sweet appoints Thorn and Beetle to take Bella and Arrow's places in the hunting band.

Storm finds some mysterious clear-stone shards in her bedding, clearly placed to harm her, as well as to make it look like she was the one who had clear-stone shards to sabotage the prey pile, by the unknown traitor. Storm and Lucky decide that a Great Howl ritual is in order to both bring everyone in their Pack closer. However, during the Great Howl, a few of the dogs from Twitch's old Pack are hesitant to do it. Rake declares that he, Woody and Ruff will leave and form their own small Pack, and Dart joins them.

When everyone is distracted, the call of what sounds like an insane dog appears, and the camp is suddenly smeared in rabbit blood, done by the mysterious dog who committed the other crimes. After the Pack works together to clean all the bloodstains from their camp, Lucky and Storm visit Bella and Arrow, only to discover that they are being tormented by coyotes. After the coyotes are driven away, Bella and Arrow say that due to the overwhelming dangers in the area, they will be moving away, and Bella reveals that she is pregnant with Arrow's pups.

When Lucky and Storm return to their own camp, the Pack is in an uproar, because Tiny, Tumble, Nibble and Fluff have gone missing – disappearing because Daisy, who was assigned to look after them, fell asleep. Storm, Beetle, Thorn and Breeze find the four little ones playing in the water of the Endless Lake. The pups are saved, and the Pack calms down. After prey-sharing, a Great Howl commences. However, during it, Storm thinks she sees a glimpse of a very large dog slinking through the trees.

Red Moon Rising
Storm, Moon, Bruno, Breeze and Chase go out hunting and decide to split up to cover more ground, though Moon ends up being pummeled by tumbling rocks falling down a slope,  knocked down by the mysterious traitor dog, though she survives. When Storm reports this incident to Sweet, Sweet declares that hunting patrollers and regular patrollers must always travel in pairs for safety. The next day, Bruno is found to be mysteriously murdered, his jaw torn off. Later that night, when the Pack tries to perform a Great Howl, a lunar eclipse occurs and the dogs believe that it is a sign that the Moon-Dog is angry about the unknown traitor dog, whom Storm suspects to be Chase.

The next day, Breeze returns from a patrol wounded, claiming that she was attacked by the traitor dog. Groups are sent out to scout for clues of the traitor's identity; Storm, Mickey and Daisy run into Fox Mist; she tells them that she witnessed Bruno's murder, though she did not recognize who the dog committing the crime was.

Storm discovers Chase sneaking away from the camp in the middle of the night and follows her, only to discover that Chase is only visiting Rake's Pack to catch up with her old friends. The next day, Beetle and Thorn go missing, and Storm, Lucky, Mickey, Moon and Breeze track them down to the abandoned town, discovering them to be leashed with ropes and being kept in a trailer house by the construction worker Longpaws as pets. Storm helps them escape.

Storm has a nightmare of the Fear-Dog kidnapping Tumble, carrying the pup in his jaws, and wakes up to find that she has sleepwalked into the Endless Lake. When she returns to the camp, she finds that Tumble has disappeared. When Storm is asked what she was doing down at the water, she confesses that she sleepwalks. Tumble is found hiding in a small cave on the beach and he says that Storm mindlessly brought him there in her jaws - mirroring the nightmare Storm just had. Later that day, Storm announces to the Pack that  she will be sending herself into exile. She leaves, trudging through the forest, considering the life of a Lone Dog.

The Exile's Journey
It has been several days since Storm sent herself into exile and became a Lone Dog, and she is heading further away from her former Wild Pack's territory, bitter but sad. She grows weaker and weaker, unable to catch prey. She eventually stops at a small riverbank in the forest to stalk a grackle, but is suddenly hit by a flash flood. Later on, she attempts to catch a rabbit, but a gray wolf catches it instead. The wolf, to Storm's surprise, is friendly and shares the rabbit with her. He tells her his name is Thoughtful, and he warns her to not pass the Dead Tree, a lightning-scorched tree near the edge of the territory of his Pack, the Still-Water Pack, since they are a bit wary of outsiders. However, she ignores the advice and spies on the Still-Water Pack's camp. She sees that, instead of individuals taking turns to eat depending on their ranking, everyone, including this Pack's female Alpha, feeds on the carcass all at once.

Days later, she discovers the scent of some Fierce Dogs and tracks them down, leading her to two fully-grown Fierce Dogs from Blade's old Pack, Dagger and Pistol, who attack her, still believing in Blade's false prophecy, though Storm manages to escape. She learns that Blade's Pack scattered after the Storm of Dogs. She flees the territory and heads farther inland, eastward, away from the Endless Lake, and eventually finds a Longpaw log cabin. The Longpaws are accompanied by none other than Whine, who has been taken in by these Longpaws, and renamed Buddy. Whine encourages her to stay the night.

After spending the night in a cage, she wakes up and talks to Whine, forming an escape plan after hearing that the Longpaws plan to take her to the vet just like they did with Whine. Whine has two other dogs living with the Longpaws open her cage and help her escape. She then realizes that she misses being part of a Pack, and goes off to find Bella and Arrow. After a few days of traveling, she gets back to the beach of the Endless Lake, and picks up Arrow's scent. She find Arrow, and they happily greet each other and he welcomes her to his own little Pack. While heading back to camp, they hear Bella howl in agony. They realize she is in labor. The pups aren't coming right, so Storm goes back onto the territory of the Still-Water Pack late one night, and calls out for help, hoping to find Thoughtful. The Still-Water Pack's Alpha and four of her subjects find Storm and surround her, demanding what she wants from them. Storm explains that she has a friend in need, but the Alpha says that they do not get involved in dog affairs, and gives Storm her second warning. After they leave, Thoughtful approaches Storm and offers to find his healer sister, Peaceful, and see if she could help with Bella's birthing. Peaceful eagerly agrees to help Bella deliver the pups, even though it would be against the Still-Water Pack's wishes, because she takes helping others in physical need very seriously, regardless of what creature they are. Thanks to the help of Peaceful, Bella gives birth to three pups: Tufty (who is stillborn), Nip, and Scramble.

Late one night, Storm and Arrow talk about Sweet's Pack. Arrow also tells Storm that he saw Breeze carrying a brush rabbit in her jaws that was still alive, suffering and in pain. Storm is shocked that Breeze would do such a thing. Over the next few weeks, Storm leads a happy life with her new Packmates. One day, Storm decides to see how Peaceful and Thoughtful are doing, so she spies on the Still-Water Pack's camp, and sees Peaceful being branded as a traitor for helping the dogs of Bella and Arrow's Pack. He is exiled for two days. The next day, to show Peaceful gratitude, Storm approaches Peaceful with two freshly-killed rabbits and offers one of them to her (the other for her own Pack), but Peaceful declines, saying she has to remain loyal to her Pack. Storm takes the rabbits and accidentally heads deeper into Still-Water territory, causing her to be attacked and given her third and final warning, and the fourth warning will be death - they also take the killed rabbits. Storm runs back to Arrow and Bella's Pack, telling Bella what happened. She then discusses her suspicions about Breeze with Bella, and Bella tells her that she overheard Breeze calling one of the Fierce Dogs a dirty Longpaw pet and a murderer.

The next day, Storm wakes up on a cloudy morning and sees that the eastern sky has turned red from the cloud-blocked rising Sun. Seeing this as a sign from the Sky-Dogs that Sweet's Pack is still in danger from Breeze, she says goodbye to Bella, Arrow, Nip and Scramble and sets off, promising that if she does not return to their little Pack in 10 days, they can come searching for her. As Storm travels back to Sweet's Pack's camp, she thinks about all the evidence and realizes that it makes sense that Breeze is the traitor, since she seemed to be absent during the crimes and due to the fact that she used to be one of Terror's underlings.

When she arrives at Sweet's Pack's territory, she hides in a bush and tries to figure out a way to ambush Breeze. The next day, after a nightmare, Storm spots Lucky, Snap and Mickey heading off on a hunting trip with Breeze as their scout-dog; Breeze heads off to patrol further along alone, giving Storm a chance. When Breeze runs off to scout good hunting spots, Storm chases her down. Breeze stops in a meadow and turns towards Storm, expecting her. Storm accuses her of being the traitor, and Breeze confirms her suspicions. Breeze tells Storm that the reason why she did all these crimes was because she wanted revenge against every dog who was involved with Terror's death, saying that she has always been the only other dog who understood the Fear-Dog. She tells Storm about all her crimes, including explaining how when she said that she was attacked by a dog she was too scared to identify, Breeze had actually beat herself up purposefully to make it look like she was innocent. She then bites her own shoulder and cries for help, making it look like Storm harmed her, leading to Storm being captured and accused. Storm is brought back to the camp, where she claims that Breeze is the traitor. Breeze suggests that Storm is mad, and suggests that they blind Storm, but Sweet decides to keep Storm hostage for a night until it is decided what they do with her. She is escorted into the Alpha den. Shortly after, Sunshine comes in with a rabbit for Storm, and tells her that some dogs believe Storm over Breeze, giving Storm some hope.

The Final Battle
A night has passed since Storm's return and imprisonment. She is brought out of the den to tell her side of the story to everyone. However, as she begins to tell it, she sees Breeze beginning to lunge for a pup, and Storm impulsively launches herself at Breeze to stop her. She then realizes, as soon as she pins Breeze down, that Breeze only pretended to strike at the pup, in order to make Storm jump at her seemingly randomly. Storm is brought back to the den and Sweet continues to ponder others' suggestions of punishment.

Storm thinks for a while, and now believes that when she brought Tumble down to the beach while sleepwalking, she was unconsciously trying to protect him from Breeze, pawn of the Fear-Dog. At one point, she is visited by Twitch, who wants to hear more of her story. Storm asks him how Breeze behaved in Terror's old Pack, and he says that he recalls Breeze being fiercely loyal to Terror. Storm and Twitch decide to visit Rake's Pack to find out more about Breeze's past. 

The next day, Storm wakes up to find herself sleepwalking out of her confinement, and notices that the camp is in an uproar, for the four pups are missing, and so is Breeze. Suddenly, Rake's Pack appears, with Woody specifically bringing the dead body of Ruff, who they say was murdered last night. Dart accuses Storm of doing it, but Lucky tells him that Storm was confined in the Alpha den all night and couldn't have done it. Twitch says that Breeze was the real killer, since Ruff was outspoken against Terror when they both lived under his rule. Search parties go out to find Breeze and the pups; Storm searches with Daisy, Beetle and Thorn. They follow the scent of the pups, and find that it leads through a meadow that is being dug up by Longpaws. They all try to get through the meadow without causing any suspicion to the Longpaws, but Thorn and Beetle attack the Longpaws, and Thorn ends up getting shot in the leg by a Longpaw that is carrying a Loudstick (gun). Storm cuts their search short.

Back at camp, Sunshine tends to Thorn's seriously fractured leg. At sunset, all the search parties come back unsuccessful, but a new search party is formed, consisting of Storm, Daisy, Lucky and Rake. The four dogs track a pup scent to the edge of a cliff, and discover that Tiny is stuck on a rocky outcropping of stone on the side of the cliff. They rescue her.

The next day, a proper funeral is held for Ruff, and Tiny discloses what happened to her the previous night. She reveals that Breeze told her and her siblings that she was taking the four of them on an adventure into the forest, where they slept for the night in a hollow at the base of a tree. Tiny woke up and began questioning Breeze's behavior, to which Breeze revealed her evil intent, and began threatening Tiny, backing her up against the cliff edge. Tiny then fell on the slab of stone on the side of the cliff, and Breeze believed she had fallen all the way down and died, so she left. At that moment, Bella's Pack appears, looking for Storm, since she has been absent for 10 days. Everyone is glad to see them again, and the three Packs agree that they will have to work together to save Nibble, Tumble and Fluff from Breeze's madness.

In the middle of the night, the Packs hear the wailing cries of the lost pups, and search parties are sent out, Storm joining Mickey, Rake and Daisy, try to follow the calls, but they cannot find the pups, so they decide to go to sleep and search in the morning. Storm wakes up in the early dawn hours to see a Golden Deer. She pursues it, and does not catch it, but it leads her to a sloping cliff at the edge of the Endless Lake. She hears the cries of the lost pups coming from some kind of tunnel beneath the slope, so she calls over Mickey, Rake and Daisy, who bring other search parties as well. They can hear the panicked calls of Fluff and Tumble, but not Nibble. With help from Nip and Scramble, Storm and Lucky enter the tunnel system to seek out the pups. Storm and Lucky find them in a corner of the cavern, and they leave the cave.

Back at the camp, Tumble and Fluff tell everyone that Breeze had told them and Nibble that Tiny had died and that they were going to go exploring underground to possibly meet the Earth-Dog. They say that Breeze was acting very odd, and that she eventually revealed her evil intentions to them, and told them to stay in the cave. They tell the Pack that Nibble wasn't with them in the cave because she was scared to enter, and so Breeze took her away, seeing her as the perfect sacrifice to the Fear-Dog in order to make up for the "insult" Storm had done by killing Terror. They say that Breeze is going to sacrifice Nibble at the place where Terror died and on the night of the new moon.

Storm, Lucky, Bella and Arrow head out into the forest to seek out Breeze and Nibble. When they come to place Terror died, they find that it is slowly being developed by construction worker Longpaws into a cul-de-sac. By nightfall, they meet three Rough Dogs (rottweilers) working for the Longpaw workers as guard dogs. The Rough Dogs say that Breeze came through with Nibble, and she had claimed that Nibble was her pup. Storm and her group continues on its way, and find that Breeze has brought Nibble to the top of a tall under-construction house, and is preparing to sacrifice the pup. Bella and Storm rush up the unfinished building, and once at the top Bella fights Breeze, only to be knocked off the edge to her death. Nibble escapes, and Storm chases Breeze in order to kill her. They make their way back to the ground, where Storm battles Breeze to the death. Breeze is choked to death by Storm's bite.

At dawn, Storm and her companions, along with the Rough Dogs, dig a grave for Bella. Storm, Arrow, Lucky and Nibble return to camp, and tell everyone that Breeze has been slain and Nibble has been saved, but Bella died in the process. They also learn that more construction worker Longpaws have been sighted nearby, planning on clearing some of the trees close to the camp. It is agreed that the Pack (Rake's Pack and Arrow's Pack rejoining Sweet's Pack) must move on and find a new home, and Arrow recommends the mountains to the north, close to the territory of the Still-Water Pack of wild wolves.

A month later, in their new mountain territory, the Pack hosts the Naming Ceremony for Sweet and Lucky's pups: Fluff becomes Earth, Nibble becomes Forest, Tumble becomes River, and Tiny becomes Sky – all in honor of the Earth-Dog, the Forest-Dog, the River-Dog and the Sky-Dog. During this ceremony, Storm glimpses of the spirits of all her deceased Packmates (Alfie, Mulch, Fuzz, Wiggle, Fiery, Spring, Fang, Splash, Martha, Whisper, Bruno, Ruff, Bella, Tufty and even the former Alpha) visiting the Pack.

A year later, everything is peaceful, and there is no fighting within this Wild Pack. They have made an agreement with the neighboring Still-Water Pack to look out for any invading Longpaws, Thorn is now three-legged like Twitch. Forest, Sky, Earth and River have become excellent hunters, and Nip and Scramble have chosen their Adult-Names: Tough and Golden, respectively. Storm notices gray fur growing on Lucky's muzzle, and wonders how old he is. Sweet then tells Storm that the Pack will need good leadership when she herself is no longer Alpha, hinting that Storm herself may become the Pack's next Alpha someday.

Novellas
On 5 May 2015, three previously published novellas were released together in a book called Tales from the Packs.

Alpha's Tale
Alpha's Tale was released on 29 April 2014. It is set before the events of The Empty City. Long before the Big Growl struck, the wolfdog who would become the arrogant Alpha of the Wild Pack grew up in a Pack of pureblooded wild gray wolves who worship the Great Wolf, hunt prey such as elk and goats, have a camp in a small sandstone-walled valley, and are in minor conflict with a neighboring wolf Pack known as the Far-Cliff Pack, as well as with mountain Sharpclaws (mountain lions). His Pup-Name was just Pup, and his Adult-Name was, humiliatingly, just Dog. Being the only wolfdog hybrid in his Pack, most of the pureblooded wolves in the Pack made him suffer for it - until he swore, one day, that he would never be the runt of a Pack again, and he leaves. He meets and rescues Snail (Fiery as a pup) from a Giantfur, and he decides to make a new Pack.

Sweet's Journey
Sweet's Journey was released on 10 February 2015. It is set during the events of The Empty City and A Hidden Enemy. It tells the story of how Sweet came to be the fearless Beta of the Wild Pack led by the wolfdog Alpha.

Moon's Choice
Moon's Choice was released on 5 May 2015. It is set between Alpha's Tale and The Empty City. It tells of Moon's past, and how she came to join the wolfdog's Wild Pack. Long before the Big Growl struck, Moon (named in honor of the Moon-Dog) belonged to a different Pack. She and her sister Star were the daughters of the Pack's male Alpha and female Beta. But when the Wild Pack was threatened by a lethal outbreak of canine distemper, Moon found unexpected help in a newcomer called Fiery, who had stumbled across Moon's Pack while he and his Pack were seeking out new territory. Moon joins Fiery's Pack to avoid the illness.

Development

Mythology
The authors knew ahead of time that spirituality was going to be a large part of the lives of the dogs, and that domestication and wildness would affect their dependence on it, and the characters' varying degrees of belief and dependence on religion would vary throughout the course of the series. The Leashed Dogs do not believe in the pantheon of gods the same way the Lone Dogs and Pack Dogs do, but as they become more wild they become more spiritual, as shown when they bury their owners' items as an offering to Earth Dog. The dogs have a pantheon for different natural elements, such as forests and sky. The series begins with Lucky as a pup being told the story of the "Storm of Dogs", when this pantheon would fight and trap living dogs in the middle; this becomes the "Big Growl", which the story is centered on.

Hierarchy
There are multiple different kinds of dogs, with various hierarchical systems. Leashed Dogs are pets, Lone Dogs are stray but live without dependence on other dogs, and Pack Dogs are stray and live dependent on their leader and Packmates. After the Big Growl, most of the Leashed Dogs have lost their owners. The main characters are part of the "Leashed Pack", a group of dogs that are all dependent on one another but without a complex social structure; it can be construed that Lucky is their leader (alpha). The Wild Pack has a stricter hierarchy, with the wolfdog as a leader; the Alpha is referred to by its title.

Terminology
There was a large group effort put into the terminology that the dogs used, as it was to be vastly different from the terminology that the cats of Warriors used. As opposed to "Twoleg", humans are referred to as "Longpaws", and their vehicles are called "Loudcages" instead of "monsters". The dogs refer to feline animals as "Sharpclaws". However, not everything in the Survivors series is shown or has a term in the Warriors series, like "Giantfurs" (bears), or "Fierce Dogs" (guard dogs). In addition, there are six types of dogs: a Pack Dog, who is part of a Pack; a Leashed Dog, who belongs to a human; a Lone Dog, who is a stray dog living on their own; a Fierce Dog, a dog bred to fight or defend; a Rough Dog, a stray dog who hurts other dogs, and a Swift Dog, a racing dog.

Themes
Gillian Philip has said that a main theme of Survivors is "fitting in", as Lucky is a Lone Dog at heart and feels out of place in his Pack. Philip says that the theme is especially relevant to many of the young readers, who are trying to find "their own place in the world and at the same time keeping hold of their new identity". Philip has also said that an advantage of writing stories is that "you can do all the romance and war and friendship and loyalty. You can do all that human stuff through animals." Philip has said that an advantage of writing about dogs is that they "are so much less self-reliant than cats", which she believed would "make for some good stories". Another main theme of the series is the complex canine Pack structure that is similar to a human family.

Publication history
The Empty City was published as a hardcover by HarperCollins on 21 August 2012 and released as an e-book on the same day.  It was released in paperback on 7 May 2013. A Hidden Enemy was published on 7 May 2013 as a hardcover and released as an e-book on the same day. It was released in paperback on 11 February 2014. Darkness Falls was published as a hardcover on 3 September 2013 and released as an e-book on the same day. It was released in paperback on 3 June 2014. The Broken Path was published as a hardcover on 11 February 2014  and released as an e-book on the same day. It was released in paperback on 10 February 2015. The Endless Lake was published as a hardcover on 3 June 2014 and released as an e-book on the same day. It was released in paperback on 2 June 2015. Storm of Dogs was published as a hardcover on 10 February 2015 and was released as an e-book on the same day. It was released in paperback on 13 October 2015.

The first book of the second arc, A Pack Divided, was published as a hardcover on 13 October 2015 and released as an e-book on the same day. It was released in paperback on 7 June 2016. Dead of Night was published as a hardcover on 7 June 2016 and released as an e-book on the same day. It was released in paperback on 7 February 2017. Into the Shadows was published on 7 February 2017 and released as an e-book on the same day. It was released in paperback on 3 October 2017. Red Moon Rising was released in hardcover on 3 October 2017 and released as an e-book on the same day. It was released in paperback on 26 June 2018. The Exile's Journey was published as a hardcover on 26 June 2018 and released as an e-book on the same day. It was released in paperback on 5 February 2019. The Final Battle was published as a hardcover on 5 February 2019 and released as an e-book on the same day. It was released in paperback on 1 October 2019.

Three e-book novellas have released in addition to the arcs. The first e-book novella, Alpha's Tale, was released on 29 April 2014. The second novella, Sweet's Journey, was released on 10 February 2015. The third, Moon's Choice, was released on 5 May 2015. All three novellas were published in a paperback bind-up on 5 May 2015 called Tales from the Packs.

Critical reception
Reviews of Survivors were initially positive, but began to take on a more negative tone as the series progressed. Booklist enjoyed the "fast-moving" plot and the characterization of the first book. The review also stated it was a "promising start" to the Survivors series. Kirkus Reviews gave the novel a starred review, writing, "Hunter expertly explores the tensions between responsibility and freedom; risk and safety; and loyalty and acceptance". The reviewer goes on to say that Lucky's point-of-view made "even the most mundane or familiar seem alive with magic". The Horn Book Magazine criticized the first book for its large number of characters, but added that its "action-packed suspense" makes a "promising start" to the series. Voice of Youth Advocates stated that while the terminology used may puzzle readers, that the cliffhanger ending will leave readers "eagerly awaiting" the next book. The second book received another starred review from Kirkus Reviews, calling it "perfectly crafted". Booklist commented on the cliffhanger, stating that it will leave "avid" fans waiting for the next installment, but many readers will be "jarred" by the lack of a satisfying conclusion. The Horn Book Magazine writes that "the large number of characters is hard to keep track of" but states that Lucky's dilemma "adds suspense". King County Library System comments om the large number of characters, but says that the action will "please fans", calling Lucky a "sympathetic protagonist". It repeats the statement in a review for the fifth book The Endless Lake, and comments again on the number of characters in a review for the sixth book, Storm of Dogs.

The Horn Book Magazine praised the first book of the second arc, A Pack Divided, calling it a "winsome, adventurous installment" in the series. It stated that new readers would have trouble tracking the characters and backstories in a review for the second book, but comments that "Hunter devotees will appreciate how the dogs' saga deepens in this Survivors spin-off series".

References

Fantasy novel series
Series of children's books
Novels by Erin Hunter
HarperCollins books
Dogs in popular culture
Children's novels about animals
Fictional dogs
Novels set in California